Allan Ackerman is an American magician who specializes in sleight of hand magic with playing cards. He has written a series of books, and performed on several instructional DVDs that teach elementary sleight of hand all the way up through advanced card work. Ackerman has also been a professor of mathematics at the University of Nevada, Las Vegas, and in addition to card magic, he also performs coin magic.

He has studied under Ed Marlo, the famous Chicago "cardician," and now lives in Las Vegas. He recently retired from teaching MCSE, MCSA, Net+ & A+ Certifications at the College of Southern Nevada.  He has a daughter named Debbie Ackerman who also does magic.

Books by Ackerman 
The Esoterist (1971)
Magic Mafia Effects (1970)
Here's My Card (1978)
Las Vegas Kardma (1994)

Lecture Notes 
"Magic Castle Lecture Notes" (1991)
"Day of Magic Lecture Notes" (August 1992)
"Every Move a Move" (1992)
"How to Tame A Moose" (1995)
"Al Cardpone: The Las Vegas Blues Lecture" (Summer 1996)
"Classic Handlings" (Fall 1999)
"I Can't Believe It's Not All Cards Lecture Tour" (Summer 1997)
"Wednesday Nights" (Spring 1994)
"Ackerman 2004" (June 2004)
The Cardjuror (May 2012)
The Baker's Dozen (June 2015)

External links 
http://www.allanackerman.com/, website as magician
http://www.allanackerman.net/, website as computer professor

American magicians
University of Nevada, Las Vegas faculty
Year of birth missing (living people)
Living people